Patricia Kelley "Trish" Suhr (born December 30, 1974 in Middlesboro, Kentucky) is an American stand-up comedian, actress, television personality, and expert best  as the "Yard Sale Diva" on Clean House, a home improvement television show on Esquire Network. In January 2018, she began hosting the Daily Draw drawings nightly on GSN.

Career
Suhr toured the US in 2018. She was the “Yard Sale Diva” on more than 300 episodes of Style Network’s Clean House. She was a guest on NBC’s The Office and Comedy Central’s Reno 911!, Suhr was a regular on FOX’s syndicated series Hollywood Today Live. She was a recurring guest host on ABC’s FABLife alongside Tyra Banks and Chrissy Teigen as well as on 20th Television’s The New Ricki Lake Show. 

She leads the Country Cool Comedy Tour. Suhr also lends her point-of-view as co-host of a podcast. 
 
Suhr also voiced Bobby June on the "Bless Your Heart" segment of Blaine County Talk Radio in Rockstar Games' Grand Theft Auto V.

Suhr is a regular contributor to Extra, Good Day LA, Good Day NY as well as a variety of magazines and as the host of National Lampoon’s Gamers, WE’s Take My Kids Please, CMT’s Family Secrets and Lifetime’s Great American Cook-off.  Known for her quick wit and razor-sharp perspectives, Suhr frequently offers commentary for popular specials on outlets including ABC (Good Morning America), Bravo, E!, CMT, and VH-1. Suhr can be seen every weeknight hosting Game Show Network’s “Daily Draw” since 2018.

Personal life
Trish lives in Atlanta with her husband and their 2 dogs.

She married Dave McCoul May 15, 2010 in Cancun, Mexico. She living in California in 2018. She was divorced in 2019 and married her second husband, Jayce Fincher June 30, 2020 in Topanga, CA.

Reference

External links

1974 births
Living people
People from Middlesboro, Kentucky
American stand-up comedians
American women comedians
American voice actresses
Actresses from Kentucky
21st-century American comedians
21st-century American actresses